Dactylodeictes is a genus of flies in the family Stratiomyidae.

Species
Dactylodeictes amazonicus (Kertész, 1914)
Dactylodeictes brevifacies James, 1974
Dactylodeictes lopesi (Lindner, 1964)
Dactylodeictes medius James, 1974

References

Stratiomyidae
Brachycera genera
Taxa named by Kálmán Kertész
Diptera of South America
Endemic fauna of Brazil
Taxa described in 1914